Selling Hitler is a 1991 ITV television comedy-drama mini-series about the Hitler Diaries hoax and was based on Robert Harris's 1986 book Selling Hitler: The Story of the Hitler Diaries.

Plot
In 1981, Gerd Heidemann (Jonathan Pryce), a war correspondent and reporter with the German magazine Stern, makes what he believes is the literary and historical scoop of the century: the diary of Adolf Hitler. 

Over the next two years, Heidemann and the senior management figures at Stern secretly pay  DM 9.3 million to a mysterious "Dr Fischer" (Alexei Sayle) for the sixty volumes of Hitler's diaries, covering the period from 1932 to 1945, plus a special volume about the flight of Rudolf Hess to the United Kingdom. Some of the money is made as payment to "Dr Fischer", but the larger proportion goes into Heidemann's pocket to finance his extravagant lifestyle and collection of World War II memorabilia, including the yacht of Hermann Göring. 

To the dismay of all, including eminent historians such as Hugh Trevor-Roper (Alan Bennett), who had verified the diaries as authentic, it is discovered after the publication of the first extract that the diaries are crude forgeries by Stuttgart criminal Konrad Kujau.

Cast
The five-part series was directed by Alastair Reid and starred:

Jonathan Pryce as Gerd Heidemann
Alexei Sayle as Konrad Kujau (aka "Dr Fischer") 
Tom Baker as Manfred Fischer, CEO of Gruner + Jahr 
Alan Bennett as Hugh Trevor-Roper
Roger Lloyd-Pack as David Irving
Richard Wilson as Henri Nannen
Alison Doody as Gina Heidemann
Julie T. Wallace as Edith Lieblang
Peter Capaldi as Thomas Walde
John Shrapnel as Gerd Schulte-Hillen
Alison Steadman as Edda Göring
Philip Fox as Leo Pesch
John Boswall as August Priesack
John Paul as Karl Wolff
Barry Humphries as Rupert Murdoch 
Devon Scott as Barbara Dickmann
Bob Goody as Nazi rally Chairman 
Robert Longden as Dr. Louis Werner
Mary Ellen Ray as Lynn Nesbit

The series, which The Guardian described as "a rollicking comedy with black edges", was released on Region 1 DVD in July 2010.

See also
 Schtonk!, 1992 German comedy film about the same subject matter

References

External links

1991 British television series debuts
1991 British television series endings
1990s British drama television series
Television series about journalism
Television shows set in Germany
ITV television dramas
Documentary films about Adolf Hitler
1990s British television miniseries
English-language television shows
Television shows produced by Thames Television
Television series by Fremantle (company)
Television series by Euston Films
Cultural depictions of Rupert Murdoch
Television series set in 1981
Television series set in 1982
Television series set in 1983
Films directed by Alastair Reid